Bessie is a town in Washita County, Oklahoma, United States. The population was 181 at the 2010 census, a 4.7 percent decline from 190 in 2000.

History
A post office called Bessie has been in operation since 1903. Some say Bessie was the name of the wife of a railroad official, while others believe the town derives its name from the Blackwell, Enid and Southwestern Railway (BES Line).

Geography
Bessie is located at  (35.385932, -98.988679).

Climate

Demographics

As of the census of 2000, there were 190 people, 87 households, and 56 families residing in the town. The racial makeup of the town was 96.32% White, 2.11% Native American, 0.53% Asian, and 1.05% from two or more races. Hispanic or Latino of any race were 1.58% of the population.

There were 87 households, out of which 31.0% had children under the age of 18 living with them, 51.7% were married couples living together, 6.9% had a female householder with no husband present, and 35.6% were non-families. 32.2% of all households were made up of individuals, and 16.1% had someone living alone who was 65 years of age or older. The average household size was 2.18 and the average family size was 2.73.

In the town, the population was spread out, with 22.6% under the age of 18, 7.4% from 18 to 24, 27.9% from 25 to 44, 23.2% from 45 to 64, and 18.9% who were 65 years of age or older. The median age was 41 years. For every 100 females, there were 128.9 males. For every 100 females age 18 and over, there were 107.0 males.

The median income for a household in the town was $26,111, and the median income for a family was $26,806. Males had a median income of $25,938 versus $19,000 for females. The per capita income for the town was $15,110. About 5.5% of families and 10.1% of the population were below the poverty line, including 5.4% of those under the age of eighteen and none of those 65 or over.

References

External links
 Encyclopedia of Oklahoma History and Culture - Bessie

Towns in Oklahoma
Towns in Washita County, Oklahoma